HARDtalk is a BBC television and radio programme broadcast on the BBC News Channel, on BBC World News, and on the BBC World Service.

Broadcast times and days vary, depending on broadcasting platform and geographic location. HARDtalk is also available on BBC iPlayer and as a podcast via BBC Sounds.

Format
HARDtalk provides "in-depth interviews with hard-hitting questions and sensitive topics being covered as famous personalities from all walks of life talk about the highs and lows in their lives."

Presenters and interviewees

Presenters
HARDtalk is predominantly presented by interviewer Stephen Sackur. Other presenters, include Zeinab Badawi and Sarah Montague.

Tim Sebastian was the original presenter when the programme launched in March 1997.

Selected interviewees
HARDtalk has interviewed many public figures of historical significance, including:

 Maya Angelou
 Kofi Annan
 Benazir Bhutto
 Hugo Chávez
 Noam Chomsky
 Michael Collins
 F. W. de Klerk
 Recep Tayyip Erdoğan
 William Frankland
 Mikhail Gorbachev
 Bernice King
 Nelson Mandela
 Mira Marković
 Robert Mugabe
 Nadia Murad
 Olusegun Obasanjo
 Teodoro Obiang
 Cyril Ramaphosa
 Thein Sein
 Nina Simone
 Hugh Thompson, Jr
 Desmond Tutu
Enrico Letta

Criticism
The Lemkin Institute for Genocide Prevention criticized HARDtalk anchor Stephen Sackur for suggesting genocide as one of two "realistic options" for the Armenians of Nagorno-Karabakh during an interview with Ruben Vardanyan. Sackur had suggested the Armenians of the Republic of Artsakh either accept "a political deal or leave" due to the 2022–2023 blockade of the Republic of Artsakh. According to Lemkin Institute, Sackur had blamed the victims for the blockade: "Artsakh is under blockade not because of the genocidal designs of Azerbaijan, but because of some inexplicable stubbornness on the part of Armenians in Artsakh or their leaders – or both, as he seems to believe". Lemkin Institute further criticized Sackur for trying to suggest the word Artsakh (the historical Armenian name for Nagorno-Karabakh) was illegitimate and for ignoring the rights of self-determination.

Spin-offs

HARDtalk Extra
HARDtalk Extra—a series of "interviews with people from the arts and culture," predominantly presented by Gavin Esler.

Interviewees include: Brenda Blethyn, Robin Gibb, Debbie Harry, Marie Helvin, Grayson Perry, Ian Rankin, Kristin Scott Thomas, and Patrick Swayze.

HARDtalk Extra Time
HARDtalk Extra Time—a spin-off of "in-depth interviews with the athletes, coaches, and power brokers in the world of sport."

Among those interviewed by Rob Bonnet, include: Nicola Adams, Roger Bannister, Jonah Lomu, David Rudisha, and Murray Walker.

References

External links

 
 HARDTalk website via the BBC World Service
 
 
 

BBC news radio programmes
BBC television news shows
BBC television talk shows
BBC World News shows
BBC World Service programmes
British talk radio programmes
1997 British television series debuts
1997 radio programme debuts
2000s British television series
2010s British television series
2020s British television series